Saint-Vitte-sur-Briance (literally Saint-Vitte on Briance) is a commune in the Haute-Vienne department in the Nouvelle-Aquitaine region in west-central France.

Geography
The river Briance flows northwestward through the commune.

See also
Communes of the Haute-Vienne department

References

Communes of Haute-Vienne